Idaho Public Television (also known as IdahoPTV and Idaho Public TV) is a Public Broadcasting Service (PBS) member network serving the U.S. state of Idaho. Consisting of five television stations, it is operated and funded by the Idaho State Board of Education, an agency of the Idaho state government that holds the licenses to all PBS member stations in the state. The network is headquartered in Boise, with satellite studios at the University of Idaho in Moscow and Idaho State University in Pocatello.

Funding for Idaho Public Television comes from three major sources. Approximately 65% of funding comes from private contributions and an annual grant from the Corporation for Public Broadcasting. 31% is provided by the State of Idaho. 4% is provided by the Federal Government.

Broadcast and online programs produced by Idaho Public Television include Outdoor Idaho, Idaho Reports, Idaho Experience, Dialogue, Idaho in Session, Science Trek and The 180 with Marcia Franklin.

History
The network's first station, KUID-TV, signed on from the University of Idaho campus in September 1965. KBGL-TV signed on in July 1971 from Idaho State University in Pocatello, followed that December by KAID-TV in Boise, licensed to Boise State University. After a decade, KBGL changed its call letters to KISU-TV in 1981. The three stations shared many programs, but were largely operated independently at first. However, in 1981, two KUID-produced documentaries—one about logging practices, another about lead exposure—caused such an outcry that the state legislature yanked nearly all funding for public television. Citing budget restrictions in early 1981, the state legislature cut 90% of the state funding for public television, and the stations relied on federal funding and private donations.

A year later, the legislature ordered the merger of the three stations into a single network. The licenses for all three stations were transferred to the state board of education. Two other stations were added in 1992 at Coeur d'Alene and Twin Falls, the respective cities of North Idaho College and the College of Southern Idaho.

In 2001, Idaho PTV began broadcasting its HD channel, KAID HD, using the default PBS HD schedule. Once the digital switchover had occurred in July 2009 and after a two-year acclimation process, the main HD channel became the home of the regular IdahoPTV schedule in August 2011, and the second standard definition channel was converted from the regular IdahoPTV schedule into a "Plus" subchannel, featuring an alternate schedule of programming.

Stations
Combined, the five stations and their extensive translator network reach almost all of Idaho, as well as parts of Washington, Montana, and Oregon. The north Idaho stations of Coeur d'Alene and Moscow are in the Pacific Time Zone, while the south Idaho stations of Boise, Twin Falls, and Pocatello are in the Mountain Time Zone.

Notes:
1. Aside from their transmitters, KCDT and KIPT do not maintain any physical presence in their cities of license.
2. The Broadcasting and Cable Yearbook says KIPT signed on January 18, while the Television and Cable Factbook says it signed on January 17.
3. KISU-TV used the call sign KBGL-TV from its 1971 sign-on until December 7, 1981. (The ISU athletic teams are the Bengals.)
4. KUID-TV was on analog channel 12 until its digital channel signed on; the analog signal was moved to Channel 35, which had previously been assigned as KUID's digital allocation.

Digital television

Digital subchannels
The digital signals of IdahoPTV's stations are multiplexed:

Analog-to-digital conversion
IdahoPTV's stations shut down their analog signals on June 12, 2009, the official date in which full-power television stations in the United States transitioned from analog to digital broadcasts under federal mandate, with the exception of KAID, which was part of the Analog Nightlight Program and was shut off on June 15, 2009. The station's digital channel allocations post-transition are as follows:
 KAID shut down its analog signal on June 15, 2009, over VHF channel 4; the station's digital signal remained on its pre-transition UHF channel 21. Through the use of PSIP, digital television receivers display the station's virtual channel as its former VHF analog channel 4.
 KCDT shut down its analog signal, over UHF channel 26; the station's digital signal remained on its pre-transition UHF channel 45. Through the use of PSIP, digital television receivers display the station's virtual channel as its former UHF analog channel 26.
 KIPT shut down its analog signal, over VHF channel 13; the station's digital signal remained on its pre-transition UHF channel 22. Through the use of PSIP, digital television receivers display the station's virtual channel as its former VHF analog channel 13.
 KISU-TV shut down its analog signal, over VHF channel 10; the station's digital signal remained on its pre-transition UHF channel 17. Through the use of PSIP, digital television receivers display the station's virtual channel as its former VHF analog channel 10.
 KUID-TV shut down its analog signal, over UHF channel 35; the station's digital signal broadcasts on its pre-transition VHF channel 12.

Translators

References

External links
Idaho PTV's website
Science Trek

Television stations in Idaho
PBS member networks
Television channels and stations established in 1965
1965 establishments in Idaho